Tatum Wannamaker Gressette Sr. (March 22, 1900 – July 19, 1997) was an American football and baseball coach and college athletics administrator.  He was the ninth head football coach at The Citadel, serving for eight seasons, from 1932 to 1939, and compiling a record of 34–41–3.

Head coaching record

Football

References

External links
 

1900 births
1997 deaths
United States Navy personnel of World War II
South Carolina Gamecocks football players
The Citadel Bulldogs athletic directors
The Citadel Bulldogs baseball coaches
The Citadel Bulldogs football coaches
United States Navy officers